Cedros is a municipality in the Honduran department of Francisco Morazán.

It is located 77 kilometers (paved road) from Tegucigalpa in an area of rolling hills with tropical pine forests.

Municipalities of the Francisco Morazán Department